Gainer is a surname. Notable people with the name include:

 Aaron Gainer, member of American Christian post-grunge band '12 Stones'
 Alice Gainer (born 1982), American television reporter
 Del Gainer (1886–1947), American baseball player
 Derrick Gainer (American football) (born 1966), American football player
 Derrick Gainer (born 1972), American boxer
 Sir Donald Gainer (1891–1966), British ambassador
 Elmer Gainer (1918–1970), American basketball player
 Forrest Gainer (born 1979), Canadian rugby player
 Frank Gainer (1888–1975), Canadian politician
 Glen Gainer, Jr. (1927–2009), American politician
 Glen Gainer III (born 1960), American politician
 Jay Gainer (born 1966), American baseball player
 John L. Gainer (born 1938), American chemical engineer
 Ronald William Gainer  (born 1947), American Catholic priest, appointed Bishop of Harrisburg in 2014
 Steve Gainer, American cinematographer
 Terrance W. Gainer (born 1947), Sergeant at Arms of the United States Senate 2007–14